Lutter is a small river in the Lüneburg Heath, Lower Saxony, Germany, right tributary of the Lachte.

It passes Bargfeld (where it is joined by the Schmalwasser), Eldingen, and Luttern (a district of Eldingen).

Gallery

See also
List of rivers of Lower Saxony

References

Rivers of Lower Saxony
Rivers of Germany